Alma Hernandez (born April 11, 1993) is an Arizona politician serving as a Democratic member of the Arizona House of Representatives for the 20th district. Hernandez was elected in 2018 to succeed Macario Saldate, who was term-limited. She was the youngest woman elected to the Arizona House of Representatives.

Early life and education
Hernandez is a native of Tucson, Arizona, and attended the University of Arizona before becoming involved as the program coordinator of Bridging the Gap, a program that helps women living with HIV/AIDS.

At the age of 14, when she was a student at Sunnyside High School, Hernandez was assaulted by two 19-year-old seniors outside the school, and then also assaulted by the School Resource Officer who intervened. This has left her with damage to her spine.

Political career
On August 29, 2018, Hernandez finished in second place in the primary election of the Democratic Party for the 3rd Legislative District, which allowed her to advance to the elections to the Arizona House of Representatives. She was elected on November 6, 2018.

Her first achievement as an elected official was the approval with bipartisan support of an agreement to initiate mandatory training in crisis intervention and de-escalation for school resource officers in July 2019. On July 6, 2021, a bill sponsored by Hernandez requiring Holocaust education in public schools in Arizona was passed by the State Legislature. This made Arizona the 16th state of the United States to make Holocaust education mandatory.

Stances

Jewish community
Hernandez has worked as the coordinator of Tucson’s Jewish Community Relations Council, and has been involved in the American Israel Public Affairs Committee.

On May 18, 2021, one of the doors of the Congregation Chaverim, which Hernandez belongs to, was smashed with a rock, and on June 7, 2021, a Chabad synagogue was vandalized in Tucson. She denounced both incidents on Twitter.

On July 11, 2021, Hernandez spoke at a rally organized by pro-Israel Jewish organizations held in front of the United States Capitol, denouncing antisemitism and stating her support of Israel.

Immigration
Hernandez has served with the Young Democrats of America Hispanic caucus, and participated in rallies protesting Trump Administration's family separation policy, as well as coordinated deliveries of basic necessities to poor families in the Mexican border town of Nogales, where her mother is originally from, on behalf of a progressive activist group she co-founded, Tucson Jews for Justice.

Personal life
Hernandez was raised in a non-religious home and converted to Judaism in 2015; she became interested in learning about Judaism during her teenage years after discovering that her maternal grandfather was Jewish. Her siblings Consuelo Hernandez and Daniel Hernández Jr. also serve as State Representatives.

After being elected to the Arizona House of Representatives, she was featured, along with seven other women, in advertisement campaign for the plus-size clothing brand ELOQUII.

References

Living people
Democratic Party members of the Arizona House of Representatives
21st-century American politicians
Date of birth missing (living people)
Politicians from Tucson, Arizona
University of Arizona alumni
American people of Mexican-Jewish descent
Jewish American state legislators in Arizona
American politicians of Mexican descent
Jewish women politicians
Women state legislators in Arizona
Hispanic and Latino American state legislators in Arizona
Hispanic and Latino American women in politics
21st-century American women politicians
Converts to Judaism
21st-century American Jews
1993 births
Hernandez family